Bethany Lee (born 1952) is an Australian former film, television and theatre actress. She guest starred on numerous television series during the 1970s, including recurring roles on The Long Arm, Number 96 and Skyways, but is best known for her role as Andrea Hennessy in the cult soap opera Prisoner.

Career
Bethany Lee made her television acting debut in 1970 with a recurring role on the television series The Long Arm as well as guest appearances on Division 4 and Homicide.

In 1973, she played the lead female in the film adaptation of Come Out Fighting and had a brief stint on Number 96 during early 1974. Her character was introduced as the "chaste and studious schoolgirl" Penny Snow who, with classmate Colin Campbell (Steve Bannister), move into one of the vacant apartments as a squatter. Her character's mother, Trixie O'Toole (Jan Adele), later moved into the building and eventually became one of the series early villains. Shortly before leaving the series, Penny Snow broke contact with her mother and disappeared. Her character reappeared later in the series when Trixie O'Toole, in an attempt to deceive George Snow, got Edie MacDonald (Wendy Blacklock) to impersonate Penny by dressing her in a school uniform. Lee later criticized the nudity in the series, specifically referring to a nude shower scene she had been required to do, in an interview with TV Week stating,

Lee again starred in a leading female role in the 1975 film The Firm Man. Between 1975–76, Lee guest starred on several television series, making return appearances on Division 4 and Homicide, but also including crime dramas Silent Number, Matlock Police, Bluey and historical dramas Tandarra and The Sullivans.

After a supporting role in the 1977 western film Raw Deal, Lee returned to television as a recurring character, Rhonda McDonald, on the drama series Skyways.

In 1980, Lee was cast her most memorable role as Andrea Hennessy in the soap opera Prisoner. Her character, a political activist, first appeared leading a protest for prisoners' rights outside the prison. It was at this same protest that her character became involved in a physical altercation with one of the prison officers, Colleen Powell (Judith McGrath), which results in her imprisonment. An attempt is made to free her by friends, Ricky Dunning (Kate Turner) and Linda Golman (Mary Charleston), and results in the kidnapping of the Governor, Erica Davidson (Patsy King). Ricky would be killed by police, while Linda later committed suicide in prison. Lee's character, becoming increasingly unpopular among the other inmates, was eventually transferred to another prison block to serve out her remaining sentence. Although this was her final television role, she would make a return appearance as another character, Edith Kipman, in 1986.

References

External links

Living people
Australian film actresses
Australian soap opera actresses
Australian stage actresses
1952 births
20th-century Australian actresses
21st-century Australian women
21st-century Australian people